JVW FC is a South African women's football club based in Bedfordview, Gauteng. Since 2013, the club has been affiliated to the South African Football Association.

The First Team competes at the highest level of women's football in South Africa, The SAFA Women's League, after becoming the first team to ever gain promotion from the Sasol League in 2019, whilst the rest of the club competes in the local league, under Eastern Local Football Association. The First Team had a memorable and record breaking 2016 season, where they beat Mamelodi Sundowns, Palace Super Falcons and Croesus Ladies for the first time since inception and went on to win the Gauteng Sasol League after defeating TUKS Ladies 6–0 in the Provincial Playoff final. JVW finished Runners up to Bloemfontein Celtic in the 2016 Sasol League Playoff Finals. 
In 2019 the First Team recorded their best season to date, where they won the 2019 Gauteng Sasol League and went on to be crowned Champions at the 2019 Sasol League Playoff Finals, securing promotion into the South African Football Association Women's National League (SAFA Women's League) which was launched in 2019, becoming the first team to ever gain promotion into this top flight league.

History

Establishment 
JVW FC was formed in 2012 by Current South Africa Women's National Team Captain, Janine van Wyk, which aimed to identify, develop, improve and expose female football players. JVW FC consisted of a mere 13 players when formed, and the club has gradually grown over the years to 98 players in the club setup.

The club currently consists of a First Team, Reserve Team (Regional League Open team), U19 team, U14 Team and a Development team.

SA Women's Sasol league 2013–2019 
2016 JVW won the Gauteng Sasol League, and finished in second place at their Debut National Championship after losing 1–0 to Bloemfontein Celtic Ladies.
In 2019 JVW won the Gauteng Sasol League for a second time and went on to be crowned Champions at the National Championship, led by Captain Nompumelelo Nyandeni.
In the same year, the club signed Olympic gold medal-winning athlete Caster Semenya.

SA Women's National league 2021–present 
In 2019 the First Team recorded their best season to date, where they won the 2019 Gauteng Sasol League and went on to be crowned Champions at the 2019 Sasol League Playoff Finals, securing promotion into the South African Football Association Women's National League which was launched in 2019, becoming the first team to ever gain promotion into this top flight league.

Players

Current First Team Squad 
As of 16 April 2019

See also

• Mamelodi Sundowns ladies

References 

Soccer clubs in Gauteng
Women's soccer clubs in South Africa
2013 establishments in South Africa
Association football clubs established in 2013
Ekurhuleni